Church of St Nicholas is a  Grade I listed church in Swineshead, Bedfordshire, England. It became a listed building on 13 July 1964.

It is a 14th-century church with 15th-century additions. There are several frescoes and misericords.

See also
Grade I listed buildings in Bedfordshire

References

Church of England church buildings in Bedfordshire
Grade I listed churches in Bedfordshire